Mihai Eminescu is a commune in Botoșani County, Western Moldavia, Romania. It is composed of nine villages: Baisa, Cătămărești, Cătămărești-Deal, Cervicești, Cervicești-Deal, Cucorăni, Ipotești (the commune centre), Manolești and Stâncești.

The commune is so named because Mihai Eminescu spent his childhood here, in the village of Ipotești.

References

Communes in Botoșani County
Localities in Western Moldavia